Andrea Migliorini (born 22 March 1988) is an Italian footballer who plays as a central midfielder.

Club career
On 20 August 2018, he joined Serie C club Cavese.

On 18 July 2019, he signed a one-year contract with the newly promoted Serie C club Lecco.

On 3 January 2021 he moved to Serie D club Lavello.

References

External links
 

1988 births
Sportspeople from the Metropolitan City of Venice
Living people
Italian footballers
Association football midfielders
U.S. Livorno 1915 players
Aurora Pro Patria 1919 players
S.P.A.L. players
Venezia F.C. players
FC Koper players
Melbourne City FC players
Pordenone Calcio players
A.C.R. Messina players
Cavese 1919 players
Calcio Lecco 1912 players
Serie B players
Serie C players
Serie D players
Slovenian PrvaLiga players
A-League Men players
Italian expatriate footballers
Expatriate footballers in Slovenia
Expatriate soccer players in Australia
Footballers from Veneto
People from Mestre-Carpenedo